Full flight simulator (FFS) is a term used by national (civil) aviation authorities (NAA) for a high technical level of flight simulator. Such authorities include the Federal Aviation Administration (FAA) in the United States and the European Aviation Safety Agency (EASA).

There are currently four levels of full flight simulator, levels A through D, with level D being the highest standard and being eligible for zero flight time (ZFT) training of civil pilots when converting from one airliner type to another. In about 2012, these FFS levels will be changed as a result of work by an international working group chaired by the UK Royal Aeronautical Society Flight Simulation Group (RAeS FSG), which rationalised 27 previous categories of flight training device into 7 international ones.  This work has been accepted by ICAO and is published under ICAO document 9625 Issue 3.  The new Type 7 Full Flight Simulator will be the old Level D with enhancements in a number of areas including motion, visual and Communications/air traffic simulations.

A Level D/Type 7 simulator simulates all aircraft systems that are accessible from the flight deck and are critical to training.  For instance, accurate force feedback for the pilot's flight controls is provided through a simulator system called "control loading", and other systems such as avionics, communications and "glass cockpit" displays are also simulated.

This standard of simulator is used both for initial and recurrent training for commercial air transport (CAT) aircraft.  Initial training is for conversion to a new aircraft type, and recurrent training is that which all commercial pilots must carry out at regular intervals (such as every six months) in order to retain their qualification to fly "fare-paying passengers" in CAT aircraft, loosely "airliners".

A Level D/Type 7 FFS also provides motion feedback to the crew through a motion platform upon which the simulator cabin is mounted.  The motion platform must produce accelerations in all of the six degrees of freedom (6-DoF) that can be experienced by a body that is free to move in space, using a principle called acceleration onset cueing, generally using the Stewart platform design.

Collimated cross-cockpit displays

The display system that shows imagery of the out-the-window (OTW) world to the pilots, is generally designed so that the imagery appears at a distant focus. This is called a collimated display, a word derived from "co-linear".  The reason is so that each of two pilots, sitting side by side, can see essentially the same OTW imagery without angular errors or distortions.  If a simple projection screen were used instead of a collimated display, each pilot would see the  OTW at different angles.

The error angle (parallax) for a simple, non-collimated projection can be estimated in the following manner:

 , where

l — lateral distance between the pilots,

R — distance from the pilot's head to screen.

So at l =1.5 m and R =5 m angle .

See also

 Flight simulator
 Acceleration onset cueing
 Latency (engineering)
 Stewart platform
 Collimation

Flight training